The Hum Award for Best Director Drama Serial is one of the Awards of Merit presented by the Hum Television Network and Entertainment Channel (HTNEC) to directors working in the drama industry. While nominations for Best drama Director are made by members in the Hum's Directing branch, the award winners are selected by the Hum membership as a whole.

History 
As of  1st Hum Awards Ceremony, HTNEC presented awards to directors. At 1st Hum Awards there were ten nominations for   different dramas serials. The Hum Awards for Best Director and Best Drama Serial have been very closely linked together. At 2nd Hum Awards, Sultana Siddiqui became the oldest and first female recipient of Best Directing Award.

Rules
As per rule declared by Direction Guild of Pakistan only one individual may claim screen credit as a Drama's director. (This rule is designed to prevent rights and ownership issues and to eliminate lobbying for director credit by producers and actors.) However, the DGP may create an exception to this "one director per drama" rule if two co-directors seeking to share director credit for a drama qualify as an "established duo".

Winners and Nominees
Each Hum Awards ceremony is listed chronologically below along with the winner of the Hum Award for Drama Directing and the drama associated with the award. In the column next to the winner of each award are the other nominees for best director. For the first ceremony to onwards, the eligibility period spanned full calendar years. For example, the 1st Hum Awards presented on April 28, 2013, to recognized dramas that were released between January 2012, and December 2012, the period of eligibility is the full previous calendar year from January 1 to December 31. However this rule was subjected to change when two (Sadqay Tumharae and Digest Writer) of nominated drama serial were still airing when nominations were announced. Date and the award ceremony shows that the 2010 is the period from 2010-2020 (10 years-decade), while the year column shows the dramas year in which they were telecast, and the ceremony column shows the ceremony number for which the nominees are awarded, for example; actually an award ceremony is held for the dramas of its previous year.

20100s

See also

 List of Asian television awards

References

External links
Official websites
 Hum Awards official website
 Hum Television Network and Entertainment Channel (HTNEC)
 Hum's Channel at YouTube (run by the Hum Television Network and Entertainment Channel)

Pakistani television awards